Ernest E. Brett was an American college football coach. He served as the head football coach at the University of Miami for one season, in 1930, compiling a record of 3–4–1.

Head coaching record

References

Year of birth missing
Year of death missing
Miami Hurricanes football coaches